The Pittsburgh Pirates are a Major League Baseball (MLB) franchise based in Pittsburgh, Pennsylvania. They play in the National League Central division. The team began play in 1882 as the Alleghenies (alternately spelled "Alleghenys") in the American Association. The franchise moved to the National League after owner William Nimick became upset over a contract dispute, thus beginning the modern day franchise.

From the franchise's beginning, the owner and manager fulfilled the duties of the general manager. However, in 1946, Roy Hamey left his position as president of the second American Association to become the Pirates' first general manager. The franchise's second general manager, Branch Rickey, was elected to the Hall of Fame in 1967. Hired in September 2007, Neal Huntington is the Pirates's previous general manager. Barney Dreyfuss purchased the franchise in 1900, bringing players including Honus Wagner and Fred Clarke with him from the Louisville Colonels, which he had previously owned. In his 32 years as owner, Dreyfuss built Forbes Field and helped to organize the World Series. Dreyfuss was elected to the Hall of Fame in 2008. Robert Nutting served as chairman of the board from 2003 to 2007, at which point he became majority owner of the franchise.

Table key

Owners

General managers

 Prior to 1946, the club presidents performed the current duties of general manager.
 As the deceased owner's son-in-law, Benswanger officially served as "president and chief executive" but in effect was general manager for his mother-in-law owner.

Presidents

Other executives
Jim Bowden
Murray Cook
Brian Graham
Bill Lajoie
Branch Rickey, Jr.
Roy Smith
Pete Vuckovich

References
General
 

Specific

External links
Baseball America: Executive Database

 
 
Pittsburgh
Owners and executives